Indonesian Muslim Council was the Muslim wing of the Indonesian Democratic Party. The movement was formed by Suryadi, the third chairman of PDI, as a way to accommodate santris and ulama in the party.

The organization was filled with Islamic figures that left Golkar and United Development Party (PPP), especially from Nahdlatul Ulama, who were disappointed by the treatment to them in the party. At the end of 1990, ten Nahdlatul Ulama figures from East Java left Golkar and PPP to join PDI. Their presence was accommodated in the Central Council of the Indonesian Muslim Council. One of them, K.H. Soerodji, the advisor of NU, admitted to left PPP due to not being nominated as a DPRD member at the 1987 elections. After he entered MMI, he was chosen as its chairman. Soerodji then recruited 20,000 members of Nahdlatul Ulama that left Golkar and PPP to join PDI.

References

Bibliography 

Indonesian Democratic Party